Mount Ossa, alternatively Kissavos (Κίσσαβος),  is a mountain in the Larissa regional unit, in Thessaly, Greece.

Etymology
The name Kissavos has been connected to South Slavic kisha "wet weather, rain."

Mythology
In Greek mythology, the Aloadaes are said to have attempted to pile Mount Pelion on top of Mount Ossa in their attempt to scale Olympus.

See also
Ossa Cave
List of European ultra prominent peaks

References

Attribution

External links

  Greek Mountain Flora
 "Óros Óssa, Greece" on Peakbagger

Landforms of Larissa (regional unit)
Ossa
Geography of ancient Thessaly
Natura 2000 in Greece